Persebaya U-20 is the youth system of Persebaya based in Surabaya, East Java, Indonesia. The team play in the Elite Pro Academy Under-20, the highest level of youth football in Indonesia.

Players

Coaching staff 
{| class="wikitable"
|-
! style="background:green; color:white; border:black;" scope="col" colspan="2"|Coaching staff

References

Persebaya Surabaya
Under-20 association football